Rita is an unincorporated community and coal town in Logan County, West Virginia, United States.

References 

Unincorporated communities in West Virginia
Unincorporated communities in Logan County, West Virginia
Coal towns in West Virginia
Populated places on the Guyandotte River